The Lô Lô of Vietnam is a Lolo ethnic group. The Lô Lô ethnic group consists of 3,134 people in Hà Giang and Cao Bằng, also including some in Mường Khương District of Lào Cai Province. They are also known as Mùn Di, Di, Màn Di, La La, Qua La, Ô Man, and Lu Lộc Màn. In Vietnam, they are officially recognized as one of 54 ethnicities of the country. Speakers of the Mantsi language are classified as the Flowery and Black Lolo people.

Distribution 
Most of the Lô Lô settles on the Đồng Văn Plateau of Hà Giang province.

Flowery Lolo
Hà Giang Province
Xín Cái, Mèo Vạc District
Lũng Cù, Đồng Văn District

Red Lolo
Hà Giang Province
Mèo Vạc District
Yên Minh District

Black Lolo
The Black Lolo live in Bảo Lạc District, Cao Bằng Province, just to the east of Hà Giang Province. Black Lolo (Ma Ndzi) of Cao Bằng is covered in Iwasa (2003).
Bảo Lạc District, Cao Bằng Province
Hồng Tri (including Nà Van village)
Đức Hạnh (Bảo Lạc)
Nghàm Lồm, Cô Ba Township

Quoc (2011)
Quoc (2011) lists the following ethnic Lolo villages in northern Vietnam.

Meo Vac District, Ha Giang
Thượng Phùng township
bản Mỏ Phàng
bản Hoa Cà
Xin Cái township
Cờ Tẳng
Cờ Lẳng
Mè Lẳng
bản Sắng Pả A/B, Mèo Vạc
Dong Van District, Ha Giang
bản Lô Lô Chải, Lũng Cú township
bản Mã Là, Lũng Táo township
khu Đoàn Kết, Sủng Là township
Bao Lac District, Cao Bang
Hồng Trị township
Cốc Xả Trên/Dươi
Khau Cà
Khau Trang
Nà Van
Khuổi Khon
Khuổi Pao
bản Ngàm Lầm, Cô Ba township
Bao Lam District, Cao Bang
Đức Hạnh township

References
 

Yi people
Ethnic groups in Vietnam